Egnasia mesotypa is a species of moth of the family Erebidae. It was described by Charles Swinhoe in 1906. It is known from India and Hong Kong.

References

Calpinae
Moths described in 1906
Moths of Asia
Taxa named by Charles Swinhoe